Virginia's 25th House of Delegates district elects one of 100 seats in the Virginia House of Delegates, the lower house of the state's bicameral legislature. District 25 represents part of Albemarle, Augusta and Rockingham counties. The seat is currently held by Republican Chris Runion.

District officeholders

Electoral history

References

Albemarle County, Virginia
Augusta County, Virginia
Rockingham County, Virginia
Virginia House of Delegates districts